Timothy Ward (born 16 February 1998) is an Australian cricketer. He made his first-class debut on 3 April 2021, for Tasmania in the 2020–21 Sheffield Shield season. In October 2021, in the 2021–22 Sheffield Shield season, Ward scored his maiden century in first-class cricket.

Ward was named as the 2022 Bradman Young Cricketer.

References

External links
 

1998 births
Living people
Australian cricketers
Tasmania cricketers
Cricketers from Sydney